Hung Chin-chang is a Taiwanese football coach and a former player. He played goalkeeper for the Chinese Taipei national football team. Currently he coaches National Pei Men Senior High School football team. Present national team goalkeepers Lu Kun-chi and Chung Kuang-tien are his students.

External links
足球綠洲交流館 , Hung Chin-chang's web site about football in Taiwan
北中足球風雲錄 , Hung Chingchang's web site about Pei Men football team

Year of birth missing (living people)
Living people
Taiwanese football managers
Taiwanese footballers

Association football goalkeepers